Brownsville is an unincorporated community in Escambia County, Florida, United States. It is located within the census-designated place of West Pensacola.  It was enumerated as a Census-Designated Place in 1960, when the population recorded was 38,417. The ZIP code for Brownsville is 32505.

Geography

Brownsville is located at 30.4 degrees north, 87.3 degrees west (30.4252, -87.2519); or approximately three miles northwest of Pensacola. The elevation for the community is 85 feet above sea level.

Brownsville boundaries include the city of Pensacola to the south and east, Avery Street to the north, and West Pensacola to the west.

Major surface roads in Brownsville
Some of the major surface roads serving the community include:
Cervantes Street
Pace Boulevard
”T” Street
”W” Street
Corry Field Road

Education
The community of Brownsville is served by Escambia County School District, which serves the entire county.

See also
Brownsville-Brent-Goulding, Florida, a single census area recorded during the 1950 Census
Brownsville Revival

References

External links
Brownsville - Escambia County, Florida. 
Brownsville Redevelopment Plan

Unincorporated communities in Escambia County, Florida
Former census-designated places in Escambia County, Florida
Unincorporated communities in Florida
Former census-designated places in Florida